Norman Thomas Byrnes (December 15, 1922 – July 9, 2009) was a 20th-century American attorney and public citizen of Boston, Massachusetts.

Byrnes was born in Waterville, New York on December 15, 1922. He was one of 12 children (one of his siblings being professor and author Robert Byrnes) and grew up in relative poverty. He was graduated from Harvard College then fought in Western and Central Europe in World War II, where he earned a Bronze Star Medal and a battlefield commission as an officer. He was graduated from Harvard Law School in 1948 after which he was a prominent real estate attorney for 53 years.

In 1981–1982 Byrnes was president of the Massachusetts Conveyancers Association (now called the Real Estate Bar Association for Massachusetts) and received that organization's Richard B. Johnson Award in 1986. He was also president of Boston's Abstract Club and a founding member of the American College of Real Estate Lawyers. He helped develop air rights for the construction of the Prudential Center, and played a major role in the development of the Federal Reserve Bank Building in Boston (he also served as Senior Vice President of the Federal Reserve Bank of Boston from 1971 to 1973).

In 1977, Byrnes was a founder of the Boston Natural Areas Network (then called the Boston Natural Areas Fund), a nonprofit dedicated to preservation of urban wilds in the Boston area. He also served as president of the organization. He was president of Massachusetts Half-Way Houses, a charity providing social integration assistance to released prisoners.

Personal life
Byrnes was an expert contract bridge player and Bronze Life Master, and was president of the New England Bridge Conference. He was married twice and had three children and three stepchildren.

Byrnes died on July 9, 2009 in Clearwater, Florida.

Publications

• 

• 

• Byrnes, Norman (principle drafter) – Massachusetts Acts of 1961 Enacted as Massachusetts General Laws Chapter 184 Sections 26–30

References

1922 births
2009 deaths
20th-century American lawyers
Lawyers from Boston
Real property lawyers
Harvard Law School alumni
United States Army personnel of World War II
United States Army officers
American contract bridge players